The sixth elections for Cardiganshire County Council took place in March 1904. They were preceded by the 1901 election and followed by the 1907 election

Overview of the Result
The election was dominated by the controversy over the Education Act and the funding of church schools. In some quarters, candidates were described as 'Progressive' or 'Sectarian' rather than on party lines. However, as in previous elections, there was a large Liberal majority, which was assured once the unopposed returns had been confirmed.

Unopposed Returns

There were a large number of unopposed returns.

Gains and Losses

A few seats were lost by Liberals.

Contested Elections

contested elections were mostly won by Liberals.

Retiring Aldermen

Eight aldermen retired, all of whom were Liberals apart from Sir Marteine Lloyd. Peter Jones, J.M. Howell, Walter T. Davies and the Rev T. Mason Jones stood in the election but were not re-elected aldermen. Sir Marteine Lloyd, Evan Richards and Rev John  Williams were re-elected without facing the electorate. John Powell stood down.

The New Council

|}

|}

|}

Results

Aberaeron

Aberbanc

Aberporth

Aberystwyth Division 1

Aberystwyth Division 2

Aberystwyth Division 3

Aberystwyth Division 4

Aeron
J.M. Howell, whose term as alderman had come to an end, was elected unopposed for a seat that was previously held by a Conservative.

Borth

Bow Street

Cardigan North

Cardigan South

Cilcennin

Cwmrheidol

Devil's Bridge

Felinfach

Goginan

Lampeter Borough

Llanarth

Llanbadarn Fawr

Llanddewi Brefi

Llandygwydd

Llandysul North

Llandysul South

Llansysiliogogo

Llanfair Clydogau

Llanfarian

Llanfihangel y Creuddyn

Llangoedmor

Llangeitho

Llangrannog

Llanilar

Llanrhystyd

Llanllwchaiarn

Llansantffraed

Llanwnen

Llanwenog

Lledrod

Nantcwnlle
Dr Evan Evans, sitting member for Felinfach, switched to Nantcwnlle, allowing retiring alderman Walter Thomas Davies to contest Felinfach.

New Quay

Penbryn

Strata Florida

Taliesin

Talybont

Trefeurig

Tregaron

Troedyraur

Ysbyty Ystwyth

Election of Aldermen

Once again a number of aldermen who had not faced the electorate were elected. Evan Richards was elected aldermen for a third term (although he had not faced the electorate since 1892) and Sir Marteine Lloyd and the Rev John Williams for a second term. The other five aldermen were new appointments, including Thomas Morris who had not contested the election. Peter Jones (an alderman since 1889 although he had always sought re-election) and J.M. Howell (an alderman since 1898) were two prominent figures who were re-elected as councillors but not as aldermen.

The following were elected:

Sir Marteine Lloyd, Conservative. (retiring alderman, from outside Council - did not seek election)
Edward Evans, Liberal (elected councillor for Strada Florida)
Vaughan Davies, M.P., (elected councillor for Llanfarian)
Thomas Morris. (from outside the Council, retiring member for Troedyraur)
Lima Jones (elected councillor for Aberaeron)
Evan Richards, (retiring alderman, from outside Council - did not seek election)
Rev. John Williams (retiring alderman, from outside Council - did not seek election)
Dr. Jenkyn Lewis.(elected councillor for Cilcennin)

By-elections
At Cilcennin and Llanfarian Conservative candidates were elected unopposed to fill Liberal vacancies. While one local paper said it 'spoke well' of the Liberals to allow political opponents to take the two seats, including that previously held by the sitting Liberal MP, it also reflected the decline of partisan politics in the county since 1889.

Aberaeron by-election
Following Lima Jones's election as alderman, three candidates contested the by-election.

Cilcennin by-election

Llanfarian by-election

Strata Florida by-election

References

1904
1904 Welsh local elections
20th century in Ceredigion